Guselka is a rural locality (a selo) and the administrative center of Guselskoye Rural Settlement, Kamyshinsky District, Volgograd Oblast, Russia. The population was 332 as of 2010. There are 13 streets.

Geography 
Guselka is located in forest steppe, on the Volga Upland, 75 km northwest of Kamyshin (the district's administrative centre) by road. Kalinovka is the nearest rural locality.

References 

Rural localities in Kamyshinsky District
Kamyshinsky Uyezd